Heusden may refer to several places:
Heusden, a municipality and a city in the Netherlands
Heusden, Asten, a village in Asten, Netherlands
Opheusden or Heusden, in Gelderland, Netherlands
Heusden, Belgium, a former municipality in East Flanders, Belgium
Heusden-Zolder, a municipality in Limburg, Belgium